Costa Rica competed at the 1968 Summer Olympics in Mexico City, Mexico. Eighteen competitors, seventeen men and one woman, took part in eighteen events in six sports.

Athletics

Women's 400 metres
 Jean Robotham
 Round 1 — 58.2 s (→ 8th in heat, did not advance)

Men's 5000 metres
 Rafael Ángel Pérez
 Round 1 — 15:41.4 min (→ 12th in heat, did not advance)

Men's 10,000 metres
 Rafael Ángel Pérez — 32:14.6 min (→ 31st place)

Men's marathon
 Rafael Ángel Pérez — DNF (→ no ranking)

Women's high jump
 Sandra Johnson
 Qualification — DNS (→ no ranking)

Women's long jump
 Jean Robotham
 Qualification — 4.75 m (→ no ranking)

Women's pentathlon
 Jean Robotham
 80 m hurdles — 13.4 s (→ 712 points)
 Shot put — 8.73 m (→ 615 points)
 High jump — NM (→ 0 points)
 Long jump — 4.74 m (→ 686 points)
 100 m hurdles — 25.4 s (→ 896 points)
 Total — 2909 pts (→ 32nd place)

Boxing

Light welterweight (63.5 kg)
 José Marín
 Round 2 - Lost to Issaka Dabore of Niger

Light middleweight (71 kg)
 Walter Campos
 Round 1 - Lost to Stephen Thega of Kenya

Cycling

Five cyclists represented Costa Rica in 1968.

Individual road race
 Miguel Sánchez — 5:20:59.18 hrs (→ 63rd place)
 José Sánchez — DNF (→ no ranking)
 José Manuel Soto — DNF (→ no ranking)
 Humberto Solano — DNF (→ no ranking)

Team time trial
 José Sánchez, José Manuel Soto, Miguel Sánchez, Adrián Solano — 2:36:25.79 hrs (→ 27th place)

Shooting

Five shooters, all men, represented Costa Rica in 1968.

50 m pistol
 Antonio Mora — 499 pts (→ 67th place)
 Rodrigo Ruiz — 485 pts (→ 68th place)

50 m rifle, three positions
 Hugo Chamberlain — 1064 pts (→ 57th place)

50 m rifle, prone
 Carlos Pacheco — 587 pts (→ 52nd place)
 Hugo Chamberlain — 583 pts (→ 66th place)

Skeet
 Carlos Pacheco — 176 pts (→ 42nd place)
 Jorge André — 75 pts (→ 51st place)

Swimming

Men's 100 metres freestyle
 Luis Aguilar
 Heats — 1:04.5 min (→ 7th in heat, did not advance)

Men's 200 metres freestyle
 Edgar Miranda
 Heats — DNS (→ no ranking)

Weightlifting

Middleweight
 Luis Fonseca
 Press — 107.5 kg
 Snatch — 97.5 kg
 Jerk — 130.0 kg
 Total — 335.0 kg (→ 17th place)

Light heavyweight
 Rodolfo Castillo
 Press — 112.5 kg
 Snatch — 105.0 kg
 Jerk — 140.0 kg
 Total — 357.5 kg (→ 21st place)

Middle heavyweight
 Fernando Esquivel
 Press — 120.0 kg
 Snatch — 105.0 kg
 Jerk — 145.0 kg
 Total — 370.0 kg (→ 23rd place)

References

External links
Official Olympic Reports
Part Three: Results

Nations at the 1968 Summer Olympics
1968
1968 in Costa Rican sport